Manmeet Kaur(born April 20, 1998) is an Indian Actress and Model. She debuted in Bollywood with Sidharth Malhotra and Kiara Advani starter film Shershaah. She started her career as a model in a teenage beauty pageant and later worked in several Television Commercials.

Music videos 
https://www.jiosaavn.com/artist/manmeet-kaur-songs/B1O2eWGcrcY_

|Dil Se Utar Gaye
|
|-

References

External links 

Manmeet Kaur on imdb

Media Coverages 
|url= https://tribuneindia.com/news/lifestyle/manmeet-kaur-might-be-an-accidental-actress-but-she-is-enjoying-her-ride-both-in-bollywood-and-pollywood-340813

https://www.pinkvilla.com/entertainment/exclusive-shershaah-actress-manmeet-kaur-begins-prep-her-next-focuses-low-carb-diet-889617?amp

https://timesofindia.com/videos/entertainment/hindi/watch-shershaah-actress-manmeet-kaur-dances-on-tip-tip-barsa-pani/videoshow/88035901.cms

https://timesofindia.com/videos/entertainment/hindi/shershaah-actress-manmeet-kaur-shares-her-experience-of-meeting-kargil-war-martyr-captain-vikram-batras-family-with-sidharth-malhotra-and-kiara-advani/videoshow/85349279.cms?from=mdr

https://www.hindustantimes.com/entertainment/bollywood/i-kept-it-a-secret-till-i-shot-for-my-part-manmeet-kaur-101630260941660-amp.html?utm_source=whatsapp&utm_medium=social&utm_campaign=ht_AMP